The United States Veterans' Affairs Subcommittee on Technology Modernization is one of the five subcommittees within the House Veterans' Affairs Committee.

Jurisdiction 
The Subcommittee on Technology Modernization has oversight and investigative jurisdiction over the Department of Veterans Affairs’ enterprise technology modernization programs and projects, including the Electronic Health Record Modernization (EHRM) program.

Members, 117th Congress

Historical subcommittee rosters

115th Congress

116th Congress

External links 
United States House Veterans' Affairs Subcommittee on Technology Modernization

Veterans' Affairs Oversight and Investigations